Wobblata is a paraphyletic grouping of all placidozoans except Opalinata. It unites the classes Placididea, Nanomonadea and Opalomonadea.

Description 

Members of this group are ancestrally aerobic phagotrophic biciliates. They have tubular mitochondrial cristae and a hairy anterior cilium. They have a split right microtubular root, i.e. one of the two (left and right) microtubular roots that support the feeding groove is split in two. They lack a cytopharynx, and some of them have lost their anterior cilium.

Phylogeny 

The cladogram shows the relationships between Wobblata and the rest of Opalozoans.

References 

Placidozoa
Paraphyletic groups